Persons for whom colleges or universities were named.

 Jacob Albright
 Richard Allen (reverend)
 Saint Andrew
 James Osgood Andrew
 Francis Asbury
 Osman Cleander Baker
 John Baldwin (educator)
 Benjamin Bates IV
 LaVerne H. Bates
 Robert Bellarmine
 Mary McLeod Bethune
 Warren Akin Candler
 Andrew Carnegie
 Davis Wasgatt Clark
 Ezra Cornell
 Jean-Baptiste de la Salle
 Washington C. DePauw
 John Emory
 Simon Fraser
 Robert Gordon
 Leonidas Lent Hamline
 John Harvard (clergyman)
 Eugene Russell Hendrix
 Thomas Jefferson
 Patrick Henry
 George Heriot
 William Samuel Johnson
 Walter Russell Lambuth
 Robert E. Lee
 Edith Lesley
 James Madison
 Albertus Magnus
 William McKendree
 William Fletcher McMurry
 Andrew W. Mellon
 Reuben Webster Millsaps
 Petro Mohyla
 John Moores (merchant)
 Henry Muhlenberg
 John Frederick Oberlin
 Daniel Payne
 George Pepperdine
 Jean Piaget
 William Paul Quinn
 B. T. Roberts
 Oral Roberts
 Bénilde Romançon
 John Ruskin
 Albert Benjamin Simpson
 Matthew Simpson
 Leland Stanford Jr.
 William Taylor (bishop)
 Stephen Van Rensselaer III
 George Washington
 James Watt
 John Wesley
 William Wilberforce
 Jawaharlal Nehru
 Mahatma Gandhi
 Indira Gandhi
 Rajiv Gandhi

See also
 List of colleges and universities named after people

Namesakes